Special Forces is the sixth solo studio album by American rock singer Alice Cooper, released in September 1981 by Warner Bros. Records. It was produced by Richard Podolor, best known for his work with Three Dog Night.

Alice Cooper appeared on The Tomorrow Show with Tom Snyder to promote Special Forces, being interviewed and looking very gaunt in full military-drag make-up, after which he gave live performances of "Who Do You Think We Are" and his cover version of Love's "Seven and Seven Is", both from the album. Cooper toured Special Forces through the United States, Canada, France, Spain and the United Kingdom, but other than the aforementioned songs he played no further Special Forces songs live, except for snippets of "Vicious Rumours" at a few shows in the U.S. and Scotland. With the exception of "Who Do You Think We Are", which was a regular part of setlists during the Eyes of Alice Cooper tour in 2004, none of the songs from Special Forces has been performed live since 1982.

French television special Alice Cooper a Paris was recorded in January 1982, before the start of the Special Forces European tour – Cooper's first tour of Europe since 1975. The tour was a major success.

Special Forces is the first of three studio albums which Cooper refers to as his "blackout" albums, followed by Zipper Catches Skin (1982), and DaDa (1983), as he has no recollection of recording them, due to substance abuse. Cooper stated "I wrote them, recorded them and toured them and I don't remember much of any of that", though in fact he toured only Special Forces.

The Special Forces tour, ending in February 1982, would be Cooper's last for over four years, as he succumbed to the abuse of freebase cocaine and a subsequent relapse of alcoholism, until his return to the road in October 1986 with The Nightmare Returns tour.

Critical reception

In a review for AllMusic, critic Greg Prato wrote:

Track listing

 "Look at You Over There, Ripping the Sawdust from My Teddybear", was listed on the album packaging, but was removed by Cooper from the album itself before the release, as he felt it didn't fit with the overall theme. It was later released in demo form on the 1999 box set The Life and Crimes of Alice Cooper, and again in demo form on the 2010 reissue of Special Forces. There is a completed studio version of the song which remains unreleased.

 "Seven and Seven Is" is a cover version of Love's 1966 original, written by Arthur Lee.

Personnel
Credits are adapted from the Special Forces liner notes.

Musicians
 Alice Cooper – vocals
 Duane Hitchings – keyboards
 Danny Johnson – guitar
 Craig Krampf – drums
 Mike Pinera – guitar
 Erik Scott – bass guitar

Charts

References

External links
 

Alice Cooper albums
1981 albums
Albums produced by Richard Podolor
Warner Records albums